Bafodé Dansoko (born 29 December 1995) is a professional footballer who plays as a forward for Deinze. Born in France, he plays for the Guinea national team.

Early life
Dansoko was born in Saint-Etienne, France, to Guinean parents. They was from Touba, Boké Region.

Club career
Dansoko was born in Saint-Étienne, France to a Guinean family as one of 6 children. He began playing football at the age of 8 with the youth academy of Hommelet CS, before moving to the youth side of Wasquehal 5 years later. He began playing futsal with Roubaix Futsal in 2013. He joined Nantes on trial in 2014, and signed a professional contract with the club starting in 2015.

Starting his footballing career with the reserves of Nantes, he shortly after moved to the semi-pro French clubs Wasquehal and Vaulx-en-Velin. He moved to Belgium with La Louvière Centre on 30 June 2018. On 9 June 2020, he signed a professional contract with Deinze. He made his professional debut with Deinze in a 2–0 Belgian First Division B loss to Union SG on 21 August 2020.

International career
Dansoko was born in France to a Guinean family. He was called up to represent the France futsal U21 team in 2013. Due to his strong performances with Roubaix Futsal, he was called up to the France national futsal team on 2014.

He debuted with the Guinea national team in a friendly 0–0 tie with South Africa on 25 March 2022.

References

External links
 
 

1995 births
Living people
Footballers from Saint-Étienne
Guinean footballers
Guinea international footballers
French footballers
French men's futsal players
French sportspeople of Guinean descent
Association football wingers
Wasquehal Football players
Championnat National 2 players
Championnat National 3 players
Belgian National Division 1 players
Challenger Pro League players
Black French sportspeople